The Jāmeh Mosque ( - Masjid-e-Jāmeh Tabrīz) is a large, congregational mosque (Jāmeh) in Tabrīz city, within the East Azerbaijan Province of Iran. It is located in the Bazaar suburb of Tabriz next to the Grand Bazaar of Tabriz and the Constitutional House of Tabriz.

Photo gallery

See also 
 Blue Mosque, Tabriz
 Saheb ol Amr Mosque

References

External links

  Editorial Board, East Azarbaijan Geography, Iranian Ministry of Education, 2000
 eachto

Mosques in Tabriz
Mosque buildings with domes
National works of Iran
Tabriz